Microvascular occlusion refers to conditions that can present with retiform purpura.

It has been suggested that phenylephrine may be a cause.

References

Cutaneous conditions